The 1954 World Student Games were an athletics competition held in Budapest, Hungary by the Union Internationale des Étudiants (UIE). It marked a one-off departure from the athletics event being linked to the biennial World Festival of Youth and Students.

The level of competition was not as high as the previous, festival-associated event, but still featured winning performances from four 1954 European champions: Lajos Szentgáli (800 metres), Anatoliy Yulin (400 metres hurdles), Ödön Földessy (long jump), and Janusz Sidło (javelin throw). Javelin thrower Földessy was the only man to retain his world student title and in the women's section Christa Stubnick repeated her sprint double (the only female repeat victor).

The women's events featured less established talents, though many winners in Budapest went on to greater success. Lyudmila Lisenko, Iolanda Balaș and Vera Krepkina eventually became Olympic champions at the 1960 Rome Olympics, while Christa Stubnick, Gisela Köhler and Irina Beglyakova were all runners-up at the 1956 Melbourne Olympics. Discus bronze medallist Lia Manoliu grew to become Olympic champion fourteen years later.

Medal summary

Men

Women

Medal table

References

Results
World Student Games (UIE). GBR Athletics. Retrieved on 2014-12-09.

World Student Games
World Student Games
World Student Games
World Student Games
International sports competitions in Budapest
1953